La Ley de La Ley is the first compilation album, what were the first three albums of La Ley, was released after the painful death of Andrés Bobe was somehow an account of the history and achievements of the Chilean group, and that is shown on the cover of the trailer, where a collage is displayed with images and clippings from magazines and newspapers.

Track listing 

 "Prisioneros de la Piel" (Bobe, Cuevas, Rojas) - 3:23
 "Auto-Ruta (Feel the Skin)" (Bobe, Cuevas) - 4:35
 "Sólo Ideales" (Bobe, Cuevas) - 5:00
 "Angie" (Jagger, Richards) - 4:30
 "Decadencia" (Bobe, Cuevas, Rojas) - 4:42
 "Qué Va a Suceder" (Aboitiz, Bobe, Delgado) - 4:21 
 "Si Tú No Estás Aquí" (Bobe) - 3:06
 "En Lugares" (Bobe, Delgado) - 4:05
 "Tejedores de Ilusión" (Bobe, Cuevas) - 4:22
 "Doble Opuesto" (Bobe, Cuevas) - 4:33
 "Placer" (Bobe, Cuevas) - 4:33
 "I.L.U." (Bobe) - 4:42
 "A Veces" (Bobe, Arbulú, Rojas) - 5:34 
 "En la Ciudad" (Bobe, Cuevas, Rojas, Clavería) - 4:20
 "Bon Voyage" (Bobe, Cuevas, Rojas) - 4:41
 "Desiertos" (Bobe, Aboitiz, Delgado) - 5:16

1994 greatest hits albums
La Ley (band) albums